Major Wilfred Nash Bolton  (1862–1930) was a rugby union international who represented England from 1882 to 1887. He was commissioned into the Wiltshire Regiment in 1883 and saw service in the Second Boer War, where he prosecuted Breaker Morant and others at their court-martial.

Early life
Wilfred Bolton was born on 14 September 1862.

Rugby union career
Bolton made his international debut on 6 February 1882 at Lansdowne Road in the Ireland vs England match.
Of the 11 matches he played for his national side he was on the winning side on 7 occasions.
He played his final match for England on 5 March 1887 at Whalley Range, Manchester in the England vs Scotland match.

International tries
Source for information in table below: Profile of Wilfred Bolton at ESPN Scrum.com

References

1862 births
1930 deaths
English rugby union players
England international rugby union players
Rugby union three-quarters
Wiltshire Regiment officers
British Army personnel of the Second Boer War
Officers of the Order of the British Empire